A Gerald Walker Christmas is the first Christmas album by American rapper Gerald Walker, released by One Step at a Time Music on December 20, 2010 in the United States.

Background
The album is inspired by Charles M. Schulz's "A Charlie Brown Christmas" and contains two traditional Christmas songs and three original songs.  Most of them are re-arranged with up-tempo beats in hip-hop-style. The title track, A Gerald Walker Christmas, uses samples from Shutlz's aforementioned work. The album was recorded in Fall 2010 in the United States, but Walker also stated during an interview with, Ynotmydream.net, that parts of the album were demoed in Chicago during the recording of I Remember When This All Meant Something.... In the same interview Gerald revealed: I've had the music for over a year now, but didn't know what I wanted to do with it. However, I knew that I wanted to knock it out and didn't want  another year pass before doing so.

Singles
The song "Keep Me Going" was first released on December 17, 2010 for promotion of the released album.

Track listing
 "Prelude" (Vince Guaraldi., Gerald Walker) – 1:47
 "A Gerald Walker Christmas" (G. Walker, C. Cobb,) – 4:05
 "Keep Me Going" (G. Walker, C. Cobb) – 3:30
 "Christmas Isn't Just a Day, you know, It's a Frame of Mind" (G. Walker, K. Fresh,) – 2:01
 "Walker of The Bells (Bonus)" (G. Walker) – 0:52

Credits
Writers: Gerald Walker
Producers: Chris Cobb, Gerald Walker, Kuddie Fresh
Executive producers: Gerald Walker
Engineer: Gerald Walker
Mixing: Gerald Walker
A&R: Barron Bollar
Recording director: Barron 'Slot-A' Bollar
Marketing: One Step at a Time Music, Inc
Art direction: Lillian Duermier
Video Direction: Chris Neuman

References

2010 Christmas albums
Christmas albums by American artists
Gerald Walker albums
Christmas EPs
2010 EPs